The 2004–05 season are the Esteghlal Football Club's 4th season in the Iran Pro League, and their 11th consecutive season in the top division of Iranian football. They are also competing in the Hazfi Cup and 60th year in existence as a football club.

Club

Kit 

|
|
|}

Coaching staff

Other information

Player
As of 1 September 2013. Esteghlal F.C. Iran Pro League Squad 2004–05

Competitions

Overall

Iran Pro League

Standings

Results summary

Results by round

Matches

Hazfi Cup

See also
 2004–05 Iran Pro League
 2004–05 Hazfi Cup

References

External links
 Iran Premier League Statistics
 RSSSF

2004-05
Iranian football clubs 2004–05 season